Roy Dale McKay (February 2, 1920 – May 29, 1969) was a football player at the University of Texas and in the National Football League. He was an All-American fullback in 1942 and was the most outstanding back in the 1943 Cotton Bowl. In the NFL he was twice named the best punter in the league and played on the 1944 NFL Championship Green Bay Packers.

Biography
McKay was born on February 2, 1920, in Mason County, Texas. He was a high school star at Junction.

Career
McKay played football for Texas for four years. In his senior year, he was the team captain and led the team to its 2nd 9-win season ever and its first-ever bowl game. In the Cotton Bowl, Texas won 14–7. In his final season he was named an All-American, All-Southwest Conference and was named the Most Outstanding Back at the Cotton Bowl.

McKay was drafted by the Green Bay Packers in the fifth round of the 1943 NFL Draft and later played four seasons with the team, followed by a brief stint with the Washington Redskins.

McKay was a member of the 1944 NFL Champion Green Bay Packers and was named the league's best punter two years in a row.

On October 7, 1945, in an NFL game against the Detroit Lions at City Stadium in Green Bay Wisconsin.  McKay fired 4 touchdown passes, all to Don Hutson in the 2nd quarter, which led to Don Hutson having the all-time NFL scoring record for most points (29) in a quarter. Before the 1948 season, he was traded to the Redskins for tackle Don Decka.

After pro football, he served two years in the Air Force as a pilot, ran a business in Hamilton, and was an assistant football coach in Yoakum.

He died on 20 May 1969 and was buried in Junction, Texas.

See also
List of Green Bay Packers players

References

External links
 

1920 births
1969 deaths
American football quarterbacks
Green Bay Packers players
Texas Longhorns football players
People from Mason County, Texas
Players of American football from Texas
American football halfbacks